Nimari or Nimadi may refer to:

something from the Nimar region in Madhya Pradesh, India
 Nimadi language
 Nimari cattle, a breed of cattle
 Nimari, Bhiwani, a village in Haryana, India